Carol Vereș (12 April 1926 – 20 February 2017) was a Romanian rower. He competed at the 1964 Summer Olympics in Tokyo with the men's coxless four where they came ninth. He died on 20 February 2017.

References

1926 births
2017 deaths
Romanian male rowers
Olympic rowers of Romania
Rowers at the 1964 Summer Olympics
Sportspeople from Arad
World Rowing Championships medalists for Romania
European Rowing Championships medalists